Jeff Shattler (born December 26, 1984) is an Iroquois professional box lacrosse player who currently plays with the Saskatchewan Rush of the National Lacrosse League (NLL). He has Ojibwe and Inuit roots and has competed internationally with the Iroquois Nationals, including with the World Indoor Lacrosse Championship silver medal winning teams in 2011 and 2015. He was the 2011 NLL Most Valuable Player, 2011 NLL Transition Player of the Year, and the 2018 NLL Cup Most Valuable Player.

Professional career
Shattler was drafted 10th overall by the Buffalo Bandits in 2005. He played one game in 2006 for the Bandits before being traded to Calgary for the 2007 season. Shattler played 11 seasons with the Roughnecks, missing only one game. During the 2009 NLL season, he was named a reserve in the All-Star Game. Shattler had a breakout year in 2011, when he was named both NLL MVP and Transition Player of the Year. On August 3, 2017, he signed a two-year contract with the Saskatchewan Rush.

Shattler has played for the Brampton Excelsiors and Six Nations Chiefs of Major Series Lacrosse and the Victoria Shamrocks and the Maple Ridge Burrards of the Western Lacrosse Association (WLA). Shattler was the Most Outstanding Player in the WLA in 2013.

NLL stats

Source:

International career

Shattler has competed internationally with the Iroquois Nationals, the national box lacrosse team of the Iroquois Confederacy. By virtue of his First Nations status, it would have been possible for him to play for Canada, the United States, or the Nationals. About choosing to play with the Nationals, Shattler said, “It’s always been my culture... Probably my grandma [a full–status Ojibwa] would kill me if I did play for Team Canada.“ 

With the Nationals, Shattler won silver medals at the World Indoor Lacrosse Championships (WILC) in 2011 and 2015. He was named to the 2015 WLIC All World Team at the transition position.

Awards and honours

Mann Cup, 2008 (with the Brampton Excelsiors)
NLL Champions Cup, 2009 (with the Calgary Roughnecks)
WLA Most Outstanding Player, 2013
NLL Cup, 2018 (with the Saskatchewan Rush)
NLL Cup Most Valuable Player, 2018

Coaching and youth development 
In February 2019, Shattler established the Shattler Lacrosse Academy, a privately owned elite lacrosse academy sanctioned by the Saskatchewan Lacrosse Association (SLA).

In addition to organizing clinics and offering private training through his namesake academy, Shattler serves as Director of Player Development and Coaching for the Fighting Sioux lacrosse program of Standing Buffalo Dakota Nation, a role he has held since 2019. His is also involved in an effort to establish a nations cup between eight reserves in the Sanding Buffalo Dakota Nation and File Hills Qu’Appelle Tribal Council (FHQ) Treaty 4 area.

He also dedicates time to clinics and programs that aim to expand opportunities for girls in lacrosse, including working once a month with Queens Lacrosse of Queen City Minor Box Lacrosse league (QCMBL), the first all-girls lacrosse team in Regina, Saskatchewan.

Personal life 
Shattler’s mother, Donna Lewis Babstock, is Ojibwa from Wiikwemkoong Unceded Territory. His father is Inuit, originally from northern Quebec. He is the second eldest of five siblings, having one older sister, three younger sisters

Shattler played junior ice hockey with the Brampton Capitals of the Ontario Junior Hockey League in the 2003–04 and 2004–05 seasons and was offered a scholarship to play NCAA Division I hockey at Cornell. After a long talk with his sister, Cindy Shattler, he decided to focus exclusively on sport rather than pursue collegiate athletics and felt that lacrosse offered him better opportunities. He has called Cindy the most positive influence on him as a lacrosse player. Beginning early in his playing career, his maternal grandmother, Gene Waseigijig, encouraged him to play for “a native team” and he has cited her as one of the reasons he chose to compete internationally with the Iroquois Nationals rather than with the Canadian national team. One of his younger sisters, Kelly Babstock, plays ice hockey with the Metropolitan Riveters of the NWHL.

Shattler resides in Regina, Saskatchewan, with his wife, Lindsay, and their children, Ada and Jace. He is a glazier by trade.

References

External links 

Jeff Shattler at NLL.com

1984 births
Living people
Buffalo Bandits players
Calgary Roughnecks players
Iroquois nations lacrosse players
Lacrosse transitions
Native American sportspeople
National Lacrosse League All-Stars
National Lacrosse League major award winners
Saskatchewan Rush players
Sportspeople from Edmonton
First Nations sportspeople
Ojibwe people